Francesco Lollobrigida (born 21 March 1972) is an Italian lawyer and politician who has been the Minister of Agriculture since 22 October 2022. A leading member of the national-conservative Brothers of Italy, Lollobrigida is widely considered one of the closest advisors of Giorgia Meloni.

Biography
Lollobrigida was born in Tivoli on 21 March 1972. He has a degree in law. He held various political positions at the provincial level, including municipal councilor in Subiaco (1996–2000) and provincial councilor in Rome (1998–2003), councilor for sport, culture and tourism in the municipality of Ardea (2005–2006) and regional councilor in Lazio region. He is a member of the Brothers of Italy and was elected as a deputy for Lazio region representing the party in 2018. From June 2018 he served as its parliamentary group leader. In the 2022 general elections he also won a seat at the Parliament. He was appointed minister of agriculture on 22 October 2022 in the cabinet led by Prime Minister Giorgia Meloni.

Personal life
Lollobrigida is the grandnephew of actress Gina Lollobrigida. He is married to Arianna Meloni who is the sister of Giorgia Meloni. They have two daughters.

References

External links

20th-century Italian lawyers
21st-century Italian lawyers
1972 births
Agriculture ministers of Italy
Brothers of Italy politicians
Deputies of Legislature XVIII of Italy
Deputies of Legislature XIX of Italy
Italian neo-fascist politicians
Living people
Meloni Cabinet
People from Tivoli, Lazio